Prunus gentryi is a species of wild cherry in the genus Prunus, family Rosaceae, native to the Mexican states of Chihuahua and Sonora. It grows along streambanks in mountainous regions of the Sierra Madre Occidental. The scientific description was published in 1937.

Description 
The leaves are thick and leathery, dark green above and lighter below. The fruits are juicy and edible, generally purple although a yellow-fruited form, Prunus gentryi forma flavipulpa, is known from the State of Chihuahua.

Uses

The Mountain Pima (= Pima Bajo) of the region near Yepachic, Chihuahua, call the tree and its fruits "aguasiqui." The fruits are a prized food, ripening in late summer.

References

External links
photo herbarium specimen at Missouri Botanical Garden, collected in Chihuahua in 1936, isotype of Prunus gentryi
photo of herbarium specimen at Missouri Botanical Garden, collected in Chihuahua in 1988, isotype of forma flavipulpa, including color photo of fresh fruits

gentryi
Plants described in 1937
Flora of Chihuahua (state)
Flora of Sonora